This article lists notable achievements of women, ethnic minorities, people with disabilities, and LGBT people in British politics.

Women
Women over 30 granted the right to vote: 1918

Women granted the right to vote on the same terms as men: 1928

First female MPs:
 Countess Markievicz, Sinn Féin MP for Dublin St Patrick's, 1918-22
 Due to the abstentionist policy of Sinn Féin, Markievicz never took her seat in the House of Commons.
 Viscountess Astor, Conservative MP for Plymouth Sutton, 1919-45

First female cabinet minister
 Margaret Bondfield, Labour MP, 1923–24 and 1926–31 and Minister of Labour, 1929–31.

First female Catholic MPs
 Countess Markievicz, Sinn Féin MP for Dublin St Patrick's, 1918–22.
 She was also the first non-Protestant woman elected to Parliament, having converted to Catholicism in 1917. She abstained from the House of Commons.
 Alice Cullen, Labour MP for Glasgow Gorbals, 1948–69. She was the first female Catholic MP to take her seat.

First female member of the House of Lords
 Stella Isaacs, Marchioness of Reading, Baroness Swanborough, Crossbench peer, 1958-71

First female Commons Government Whip
 Harriet Slater, Labour MP, 1964–66

First female Lords Government Whip
 Annie Llewelyn-Davies, Baroness Llewelyn-Davies of Hastoe, Labour Lords Chief Whip, 1973–82

First female Prime Minister
 Margaret Thatcher, Conservative Prime Minister 1979–90
First female foreign secretary
 Margaret Beckett, Labour Foreign Secretary 2006-07
First female home secretary
 Jacqui Smith, Labour Home Secretary 2007-09

First female leader of the House of Lords
 Janet Young, Baroness Young, Conservative Leader 1981–83

First female Speaker of the House of Commons
 Betty Boothroyd, Labour Speaker 1992–2000

First female leader of the House of Commons
 Ann Taylor, Labour Leader 1997–98

First female Justice secretary and Lord High Chancellor
 Liz Truss, 2016–17

First female Law Lord
 Brenda Hale, Baroness Hale of Richmond, 2004–present

First female speaker in the House of Lords
 Helene Hayman, Baroness Hayman, Lord Speaker 2006–11 (and first person to hold that title)

First female Lord Spiritual
 Rachel Treweek, The Lord Bishop of Gloucester, 2015–present

 First female ethnic minority member of the Senedd 

 Natasha Asghar, 2021–present

Blind people
First blind MP
 Henry Fawcett, Liberal MP for Brighton, 1864–74

First blind member of the House of Lords
Ian Fraser, Baron Fraser of Lonsdale, Conservative peer, 1958–74

First blind Cabinet member
 David Blunkett, Labour Secretary of State for Education, 1997–2001, then Home Secretary 2001-04

First blind MSP
 Dennis Robertson, SNP MSP for Aberdeenshire West, 2011–16

First female blind MP (and first black blind MP)
 Marsha de Cordova, Labour MP for Battersea, 2017–present

Wheelchair users
First MP in a wheelchair
 Arthur MacMorrough Kavanagh, Conservative MP for County Wexford (1866–68) and for County Carlow (1868–80). MacMurrough Kavanagh (who had been born with partially formed arms and legs) was given dispensation to be accompanied in the Commons Chamber by a servant who helped place him on the benches.

First female MP in a wheelchair
 Anne Begg, Labour MP for Aberdeen South, 1997–2015

Black Britons
First black MPs:
 James Townsend, Whig MP for Calne, 1782-87
 John Stewart, Tory MP for Lymington, 1832-47
 Henry Redhead Yorke, Whig MP for City of York, 1841-48
 Peter McLagan, Liberal MP for Linlithgowshire, 1865-93
 Bernie Grant, Labour MP for Tottenham, 1987–2000
 Paul Boateng, Labour MP for Brent South, 1987–2005
 Diane Abbott, Labour MP for Hackney North and Stoke Newington, 1987–present

First black woman MP
 Diane Abbott, Labour MP for Hackney North and Stoke Newington, 1987–present

First black cabinet member
 Paul Boateng, Labour Chief Secretary to the Treasury, 2002–05

First black female Cabinet member
Valerie Amos, Labour Secretary of State for International Development, May–October 2003
First elected black female minister
Dawn Butler, Labour Minister for Young Citizens and Youth Engagement, October 2009 – May 2010

First elected black Secretary of State

 Kwasi Kwarteng, Conservative Secretary of State for Business, Energy and Industrial Strategy, 2021–22

First black  Member of the Welsh Assembly
 Vaughan Gething, Labour and Co-op AM for Cardiff South and Penarth, 2011–present

First black Lord Mayor of London
 James Townsend, Lord Mayor of London 1772-74

British Chinese 
First Member of the Northern Ireland Assembly of Chinese origin
 Anna Lo (盧曼華), Alliance Party MLA for Belfast South, 2007–16

First British MP of Chinese origin
 Alan Mak, Conservative MP for Havant, 2015–present

First female British MP of Chinese origin
 Sarah Owen, Labour MP for Luton North, 2019–present

Czech Britons
First Czech-born MP
 Robert Maxwell, Labour MP for Buckingham 1964–1970

Polish Britons

 First MP of Polish Jewish descent 

 Manny Shinwell, Labour MP for Linlithgowshire, Seaham and Easington, 1922–1924, 1928–1931 and 1935–1970

First Polish-born MP
 Daniel Kawczynski, Conservative MP for Shrewsbury and Atcham, 2005–present

South Asians
Note: South Asians include those of Indian, Pakistani, Sri Lankan, Nepalese or Bangladeshi ancestry
First South Asian MP
 David Ochterlony Dyce Sombre, MP for Sudbury from July 1841 to April 1842.
First South Asian Cabinet member
 Sajid Javid, Conservative Secretary of State for Culture, Media and Sport 2014–15, then Secretary of State for Business, Innovation and Skills (2015–2016), Secretary of State for Communities and Local Government (2016–18), Home Secretary (2018–19), Chancellor of the Exchequer (2019–20) and Secretary of State for Health and Social Care (2021–22).

Javid, who is of Pakistani descent, was succeeded  as Chancellor of the Exchequer by Rishi Sunak, who is of Indian descent. This was the first time that someone from an ethnic minority  had been succeeded in one of the Great Offices of State by another person from that category.

First South Asian Member of the Welsh Assembly
 Mohammad 'Oscar' Asghar, Conservative AM for South Wales East 2007–20
First South Asian Member of the Scottish Parliament
 Bashir Ahmad, Scottish National Party MSP for Glasgow, 2007–09

First female South Asian MP
 Rushanara Ali, Labour MP for Bethnal Green and Bow, 2010–present
 Priti Patel, Conservative MP for Witham 2010–present (and first female Hindu MP; also Home Secretary 2019–22)

 First MP of Burmese descent 
 Paul Scully, Conservative MP for Sutton and Cheam 2015–present
First South Asian Prime Minister of the United Kingdom

Rishi Sunak is the first person of colour to hold the office of prime minister 

Rishi Sunak, Conservative Prime Minister 2022–present

Jews
First Jewish Prime Minister
 Benjamin Disraeli MP, Conservative Party Prime Minister in 1868 and 1874-1880

Second Jewish MP
 Lionel de Rothschild, Liberal MP for City of London, 1847–68

First female Jewish MP
 Marion Phillips, Labour MP for Sunderland, 1929–31

First Jewish Speaker of the House of Commons
 John Bercow, 2009–19

Muslims
First Muslim MP
 Mohammad Sarwar, Labour MP for Glasgow Central, 1997–2010

First female Muslim MPs
 Rushanara Ali, Labour MP for Bethnal Green and Bow, 2010–present
 Shabana Mahmood, Labour MP for Birmingham Ladywood, 2010–present
 Yasmin Qureshi, Labour MP for Bolton South East, 2010–present

First hijab-wearing Muslim MP
 Apsana Begum, Labour MP for Poplar and Limehouse, 2019–present

Hindus

 First Hindu MP 
 Shailesh Vara, Conservative MP for North West Cambridgeshire, 2005–present

 First Hindu cabinet minister 
 Priti Patel, Secretary of State for International Development, 2016–17

First Hindu Prime Misister
Rishi Sunak, Conservative Prime Minister 2022–present

Sikhs
First Sikh MP
 Piara Khabra, Labour MP for Ealing Southall, 1992–2007

First female Sikh MP
 Preet Gill, Labour Co-op MP for Birmingham Edgbaston, 2017–present

First turban-wearing Sikh MP
 Tanmanjeet Singh Dhesi, Labour MP for Slough, 2017–present

Buddhists
First Buddhist MP
 Suella Braverman, Conservative MP for Fareham, 2015–present

Zoroastrians 
First Zoroastrian MP

 Dadabhai Naoroji, Liberal MP for Finsbury Central, 1892–95

LGBT people 

First openly lesbian MP: Maureen Colquhoun, Labour MP for Northampton North, 1974-79 (outed before coming out)

First openly gay MP (and first openly gay Cabinet minister): Chris Smith, Labour MP for Islington South and Finsbury, from 1983 to 2005 and National Heritage/Culture secretary, 1997-2001

First openly gay Member of the House of Lords: Waheed Alli, Baron Alli, Labour Member of the House of Lords, 1998–present (came out in 1999)

First openly bisexual MP: Simon Hughes, Liberal Democrat MP for Bermondsey and Old Southwark, from 1983 - 2015 (outed before coming out, came out in 2006)

First openly transgender MP: Jamie Wallis, Conservative MP for Bridgend, 2019 - present (came out in March 2022) 

First openly transgender MEP: Nikki Sinclaire, United Kingdom Independence Party (later Independent) MEP for the West Midlands from 2009 – 2014. Sinclaire stepped down shortly after coming out in 2013.

First openly lesbian Member of the House of Lords: Deborah Stedman-Scott, Baroness Stedman-Scott, Conservative Member of the House of Lords, 2010–present

First openly lesbian Cabinet minister: Justine Greening, Secretary of State for International Development, 2012–16 (came out in 2016)

First openly pansexual MP: Layla Moran, Liberal Democrat MP for Oxford West and Abingdon, from 2017–present (came out in 2020)

First openly gay member of the Northern Ireland Assembly:
 John Blair, Alliance MLA for South Antrim, 2018–present (co-opted to the seat, re-elected in subsequent elections)
 Eóin Tennyson, Alliance MLA for Upper Bann, 2022–present (elected)

See also 
 List of electoral firsts in Canada
 List of electoral firsts in New Zealand

References and notes

Firsts
Lists of firsts
United Kingdom politics-related lists